Per Petterson (born 18 July 1952 in Oslo) is a Norwegian novelist. His debut book was Aske i munnen, sand i skoa (1987), a collection of short stories. He has since published a number of novels to good reviews. To Siberia (1996), set in the Second World War, was published in English in 1998 and nominated for the Nordic Council Literature Prize. I kjølvannet, translated as In the Wake (2002), is a young man's story of losing his family in the Scandinavian Star ferry disaster in 1990 (Petterson himself lost his mother, father, younger brother and a niece in the disaster); it won the Brage Prize for 2000. His 2008 novel Jeg forbanner tidens elv (I Curse the River of Time) won the Nordic Council Literature Prize for 2009, with an English translation published in 2010.

His breakthrough novel was Ut og stjæle hester (2003), which was awarded two top literary prizes in Norway – the Norwegian Critics Prize for Literature and the Booksellers’ Best Book of the Year Award.  The 2005 English language translation, Out Stealing Horses, was awarded the 2006 Independent Foreign Fiction Prize and the 2007 International Dublin Literary Award (the world's largest monetary literary prize for a single work of fiction published in English, €100,000). Out Stealing Horses was named one of the 10 best books of the year in the 9 December 2007 issue of the New York Times Book Review.

Petterson is a librarian. He has worked as a bookstore clerk, translator and literary critic before becoming a full-time writer. He cites Knut Hamsun and Raymond Carver among his influences.

Petterson's works have been translated into almost 50 languages.

Bibliography
 1987 – Ashes in My Mouth, Sand in My Shoes (Aske i munnen, sand i skoa) - translated into English by Don Bartlett, 2013
 1989 – Echoland (Ekkoland) translated into English by Don Bartlett, 2016
 1992 – It's Fine By Me (Det er greit for meg) – translated into English by Don Bartlett, 2011
 1996 – To Siberia (Til Sibir) – translated into English by Anne Born
 2000 – In the Wake (I kjølvannet))
 2003 – Out Stealing Horses (Ut og stjæle hester )
 2004 – Månen over Porten
 2008 – I Curse the River of Time (Jeg forbanner tidens elv)
 2012 – I refuse (Jeg nekter)
 2015 – Ashes in My Mouth, Sand in My Shoes, translated by Don Bartlett (first story collection re-issued April 7, 2015, by Graywolf Press.)
 2015 – I Refuse, translated by Don Bartlett (April 7, 2015 Graywolf Press, first printing in the United States.)

Awards and Prizes
Nordic Council Literature Prize, 2009
Brage Prize, 2008
Norwegian Critics Prize for Literature, 2008
International Dublin Literary Award, 2007
One of the 5 Best Fiction Books of 2007, New York Times
One of the 10 Best Fiction Books of 2007, Time Magazine
A New York Library Book to Remember, 2007
Le Prix Mille Pages, 2007
Le Prix Litteraire Europeen Madeleine Zepter, 2007
Independent Foreign Fiction Prize, 2006
Norwegian Critics Prize for Literature, 2003
Norwegian Booksellers' Prize, 2003
Brage Prize, 2000

References

External links
Novelist Per Petterson on Voice, Landscape and His "New" Novel, To Siberia – Tom Christie in LA Weekly, December 9, 2008
Per Petterson  at Aschehoug Agency
Per Petterson at Forlaget Oktober
Bookbrowse.com – Book Summary and Media Reviews for Out Stealing Horses
"A Northern Light: Per Petterson's Poignant Family Tales Have Placed Him on the Literary Map" – Bob Thompson, Washington Post Staff Writer, December 26, 2007
PEN World Voices: Language Within Silence, Joy E. Stocke
"Per Petterson: A Family Approach To Fiction" by Lynn Neary, NPR, September 26, 2010
"Late and Soon. The novels of Per Petterson". By James Wood, The New Yorker, December 10, 2012.

Reviews
I Curse the River of Time – Bob Thompson in The Washington Post, August 10, 2010
I Curse the River of Time – Rachel Cusk in The Guardian, July 10, 2010
I Curse the River of Time – Stacey D'Erasmo in The New York Times, August 13, 2010
I Curse the River of Time – Susan Salter Reynolds in Los Angeles Times, August 21, 2010
Out Stealing Horses – Thomas McGuane in The New York Times, June 24, 2007
Out Stealing Horses – Paul Binding in The Independent, November 6, 2005
Book review of Out Stealing Horses at Prairieprogressive.com
I Refuse – The Daily Beast, August 20, 2015

1952 births
Living people
21st-century Norwegian novelists
Norwegian Critics Prize for Literature winners
Nordic Council Literature Prize winners
Writers from Oslo
Norwegian librarians